Families is a daytime soap opera, which was on ITV from 1990 to 1993 and created by Kay Mellor. It followed two families; the Thompsons, based in Cheshire, England (in the fictional market town of Westbury), and the Stevens, living in Sydney. It was produced and recorded at Studio 6 at Granada Studios in Manchester.

History
It was broadcast twice a week (Monday and Tuesday) at 3.20 pm with the first episode broadcast on 23 April 1990. Both episodes were also repeated on Thursday 10.40 pm in the Granada TV region as part of Granada's "10.40-extra" strand. The show was unusual for a daytime soap, regularly tackling subjects that at the time would have been deemed controversial for a prime time soap. These included murder, suicide, incest, drugs, adultery, prostitution, mental health problems and homosexuality. It also contained some strong language and scenes of a sexual nature, all of which were screened, in most ITV regions, just before children's TV started at 15.50. In its later months the show was screened at 14.45–15.15. The theme music was by Matthew Scott. 

The Granada-produced soap ceased production in July 1993, to make way for daytime repeats of Coronation Street and Emmerdale. The last show episode of 320 was broadcast in August 1993. It had a dramatic feature length finale which saw a birth, a possible suicide and a large and unexpected inheritance.

Several of those who worked on the series later went on to higher-profile careers: Jude Law was a regular cast member for two years (as Nathan Thompson) and Russell T Davies wrote for the programme. Amanda Wenban went from Families to star in the Yorkshire Television soap Emmerdale before heading back to Cheshire to play the role of Ruth Tyler in the second series of Russell T Davies' camp and ironic late night soapy-drama Revelations.

Storylines
The link in the storyline was businessman Mike Thompson (Malcolm Stoddard), who walked out on his family on his birthday and flew to Australia to be with his true love Diana Stevens (Briony Behets), whom he had left years earlier.  Unbeknownst to Mike, Diana had given birth to his son Andrew (Tayler Kane) and as complications ensued over the abrupt life changes for both families, Andrew travelled to England, where he met Mike's daughter, Amanda (Laura Girling), by his English wife Sue (Morag Hood), and they fell in love, not realising that they were half-brother and sister. This plot line was somewhat similar to the opening storyline of the popular Australian soap opera Sons and Daughters which had successfully aired on ITV daytime since 1983.

After two years, stories involving the Thompson and Stevens families—and the UK-Australian crossover angle—had run their course, with several characters either dead or left for pastures new (typically Brighton or Canberra). In their place came the wealthy Bannerman family, who were introduced during the summer of 1992, as they moved into the Thompsons' Cheshire mansion from a suburb of Manchester. In addition, some of the remaining Australian-based characters (including Diana Stevens and her husband Anton Vaughan) were re-located to England.

The series subsequently followed the intrigues involving the new family. Head of the Bannerman household was successful barrister Charles (Terence Harvey). The rest of the family comprised Charles' decorative wife Isabelle (Helen Bourne) and their four children—upstanding heir to the family law firm Simon (Thomas Russell), irresponsible teenager Matthew (Oliver Milburn), angelic countrywoman Rebecca (Karen Westwood) and beautiful go-getting vamp Juliette (Emma Davies). Juliette's best friend and Simon's fiancée Fiona Lewis (Claire Marchionne) also appeared, and turned out to be Charles' mistress.

To add balance to the series, the Richards family, who ran the local pub (The Railway), were also prominently featured, having been introduced during the latter Thompson family era in April 1991. They comprised: Larry (John Bowe), Jane (Margot Leicester) and daughters Chelsea (Tara Moran) and Louise (Victoria Finney). A son David was mentioned but never seen on-screen, as he lived in the US. Also present was Jane's sister Jackie Williams (Amanda Wenban) who had emigrated to Australia years earlier but was visiting Jane when the Richards family was first introduced. On her return to her own family in Sydney, she helped continue the UK-Australian crossover angle for a further year.

Main cast

Mike Thompson – Malcolm Stoddard
Sue Thompson – Morag Hood
Mark Thompson – Martin Glyn Murray
Nathan Thompson – Jude Law
John Thompson – Tim Woodward
Amanda Thompson – Laura Girling
Diana Stevens – Briony Behets
Christian Stevens – Simon Edward Stokes
Andrew Stevens – Tayler Kane
Justine Stevens – Imogen Annesley
George Davidson – Harry Littlewood
Ruby Davidson – Madge Ryan
Rachel Grandby – Anna Welsh
Corinne Todd – Tessa Humphries
Barbara Todd – Lyn Ashley
Lisa Shepherd – Jane Hazlegrove
Jackie Williams – Amanda Wenban
Brian Williams – Kim Knuckey
Paul Williams – Craig Black
Jade Williams – Sascha Huckstepp
Don McLeod – Bruce Hughes
Anton Vaughan – Rhett Walton
Larry Richards – John Bowe
Jane Richards – Margot Leicester
Chelsea Richards – Tara Moran
Louise Richards Victoria Finney
Neil Brooks – Patrick Cremin
Charles Bannerman – Terence Harvey
Isabelle Bannerman – Helen Bourne
Rebecca Bannerman – Karen Westwood
Simon Bannerman – Thomas Russell
Juliette Bannerman – Emma Davies
Matthew Bannerman – Oliver Milburn
Fiona Lewis – Claire Marchionne
Steve Harvey – Terence Hillyer
Linda Harvey – Louise Plowright
Gary Harvey – Jim Shepley
Daniel Fielding – Gary Turner
Dot Downing – Joan Campion
James Proctor – Harry Shearer
Dex – Harry Van Gorkum
Chris Harrison – Richard Standing

Filming
The show was filmed in north east Cheshire and Altrincham. Much of the UK/Australia plot was directed by Nicholas Ferguson, with all of the interior scenes shot in the Granada studio in Manchester. Cicely Mill in the village of Rostherne, Cheshire, was used as the Thompson/Bannerman house. The stables where Amanda and subsequently Rebecca ran their business were in the nearby Tatton Park estate (the stables have since been converted into a coffee shop/restaurant). The Thompsons' garage was Ashley Smithy Garage in Ashley and The Railway Pub can be found in Heatley. Fiona Lewis and Simon Bannerman got married in St Oswald's church, Lower Peover (which also featured in Revelations) and the aborted first wedding of Amanda Thompson and Neil Brooks was in St Mary's church, Nether Alderley.

Repeats
The series was given a full repeat on Granada Plus, when it launched on 1 October 1996, usually screened weeknights at 18:30. The run concluded on Friday 26 June 1998 and was replaced by Emmerdale from Monday 29 June 1998, with episodes beginning from 1989.

Notes

References

External links

1990 British television series debuts
1993 British television series endings
1990s British television soap operas
British television soap operas
ITV soap operas
Television series by ITV Studios
Television shows produced by Granada Television
English-language television shows
Television series about families
Television shows set in Cheshire